SS Agamemnon was one of the first successful long-distance merchant steamships. She was built in 1865 to trade between Britain and China, and competed with tea clippers before and after the opening of the Suez Canal in 1869. She brought together three improvements in steamship design: higher boiler pressure, an efficient and compact compound steam engine, and a hull form with modest power requirements.

Before Agamemnon, steamships were not a practical commercial option for trade between Britain and the Far East. The amount of coal that they needed to carry left little space for cargo. This was substantially less than other ships of the time – a saving of between 23 and 14 tons per day was achieved. This enabled her to steam to China with a coaling stop at Mauritius on the outward and return journey.

Building and performance
Agamemnon was the first of three sister ships, the others being Achilles (1866) and Ajax (1867). Scotts Shipbuilding and Engineering Company of Greenock, Renfrewshire built the three ships  for Alfred and Phillip Holt's Ocean Steam Ship Company, later called the Blue Funnel Line.

Agamemnon (and her sister ships) combined three key features.

The first was a higher boiler pressure than was normally used on British merchant ships. Alfred Holt had experimented with a boiler pressure of 60 psi in the Cleator, a ship he used as a floating testbed. Holt overcame the Board of Trade's objections to boiler pressures above 25 psi in seagoing vessels.

The second feature was her compound steam engine, designed by Alfred Holt. As well as being more efficient than others of the time, it was a relatively compact engine, so used less cargo space.

The third was a hull that was strong in relation to its weight and cost and with modest power requirements – again developed by Alfred Holt.

Agamemnons fuel efficiency enabled her to compete successfully with tea clippers between Britain and China. She could steam from London to Mauritius, a distance of 8,500 miles (roughly half the distance to China via the Cape of Good Hope) without coaling.

Her normal journey time from Foochow to Liverpool was 58 days, whereas clippers could take anything from a record-breaking 88 days to 140 or more, and averaged 123 days in 1867–68. Further, her cargo carrying capacity was two or three times as much as these sailing ships.

Maiden voyage
The newly built Agamemnon arrived in Liverpool, her home port, from Greenock on 1 April 1866, the year of the clippers' Great Tea Race. She sailed for China on 19 April. Her outward passage was the quickest recorded to date, reaching Mauritius in 40 days and Singapore in 60. The whole journey from Liverpool to Hong Kong took 65 days. This beat the fastest tea clipper outward passage of 77 days by the Cairngorm in 1853.

Later voyages
The opening of the Suez Canal in 1869 guaranteed the success of Agamemnon and her sister ships by shortening the route that a steamship could take from Europe to China  whilst sailing vessels still had to travel via the Cape of Good Hope. In a few years the predominance of tea clippers in the China trade had ceased. Associates and competitors of Alfred Holt built similar ships and the nature of long-distance maritime trade had taken a major technological change.

Fate
In 1897 Agamemnon was transferred to Alfred Holt's Dutch subsidiary Nederlandsche Stoomboot Maatschappij Ocean. She was scrapped in 1899.

References

1865 ships
Ships built on the River Clyde
Steamships of the United Kingdom
Victorian-era merchant ships of the United Kingdom